...and the Beat Goes On! is the debut studio album by German dance group Scooter. Four singles were released from it: "Hyper Hyper", "Move Your Ass!", "Friends" and "Endless Summer".

Production 
After the success of the single "Hyper Hyper", Scooter decided to make their debut album. Released in early 1995, it contains brand new tracks and reworked "The Loop!"-remixes. There are no gaps between the tracks, it sounds like an imaginary Scooter gig.

The album was re-released in 2013 in the "20 Years of Hardcore Expanded Edition" series. This version contains 3 CDs: the first is the digitally remastered original album; the other two contains the singles, B-sides, live recordings and remixes related to the album.

Track listing

Notes
 "Waiting for Spring" is based on The Loop!'s remix of the 1994 single "Parade" by Community Featuring Fonda Rae, entitled "Parade (Waiting 4 Spring)". The Loop! was composed of H.P. Baxxter, Rick J. Jordan and Ferris Bueller before they became Scooter.
 "Hyper Hyper" takes elements from Scottish group Ultra-Sonic's 1993 song "Annihilating Rhythm", much to Ultra-Sonic's chagrin.
"Faster Harder Scooter" is a different track than "FasterHarderScooter" from the 1999 album "Back to the Heavyweight Jam".

Charts

References

1995 debut albums
Scooter (band) albums
Edel AG albums